Stinky is a village in eastern Ukraine, located in Kramatorsk Raion, Donetsk Oblast. It had a population of 265 people, as of 2001.

Politics 
In the 2014 Ukrainian parliamentary elections, there were 162 registered voters from Stinky, with 29.01% turnout. The most votes (34.04%) were cast for the Communist Party of Ukraine, 23.40% for Opposition Bloc, and 14.89% for People's Front.

Demographics 
As of the 1989 Soviet census, the settlement had a population of 363 people, of whom 158 were men and 205 were women.

By the time of the 2001 Ukrainian census, the population had shrunk to 265. Their native languages were:

References 

Rural settlements in Donetsk Oblast
Villages in  Kramatorsk Raion